Hari Hari (sometimes spelled Harihari) is a small rural settlement in the south west of the West Coast region of New Zealand's South Island. The name has a Maori meaning, from Te Aka Maori/English Dictionary, as "to take/carry joy" or, as local legend suggests, "come together in unison" from a Maori canoe paddling chant/song. In recent years, Hari Hari has been increasingly referred to as "Harihari" with Maori meaning as "ambulance". No official statutory process has taken place in order for this to happen.

It is slightly inland from the Tasman Sea and the Saltwater Lagoon and is situated between the Wanganui and Poerua Rivers, 45 minutes south of the tourist town of Hokitika.  passes through the town on its route from Ross to the Franz Josef Glacier.

The population of Hari Hari and its surrounds was 330 in the 2013 census, a reduction of 21 since 2006.

Hari Hari was once a logging settlement and relics of a bush tramway that used to carry timber can be found in the area.  Today, the forest in the area is protected and popular activities in the Hari Hari area include bushwalking, birdwatching, and trout and salmon fishing.

The Inter-Wanganui Co-op opened a dairy factory at Hari Hari in 1908, but it is now a ruin.

Hari Hari's main claim to fame occurred on 7 January 1931, when Australian aviator Guy Menzies landed upside down in a swamp near Hari Hari, completing the first solo flight across the Tasman Sea.  Menzies, who had left Sydney 11 hours and 45 minutes earlier, was aiming for Blenheim but had been blown off course and mistook a swamp for flat pasture suitable for landing.  Despite the accident, he was unharmed.  On 7 January 2006, the 75th anniversary celebrations of the feat were held in Hari Hari, with roughly 400 people in attendance.  To mark the occasion, Dick Smith recreated Guy Menzies' flight, though Smith chose to land upright in Hari Hari.

Local name change controversy
Many local residents are upset about the growing number of official websites, and official documentation, referring to Hari Hari as being "Harihari". The greater community insists that they were not informed or talked to about this matter, and are against the gradual unofficial change. Some are being active about keeping their town's name the same, and have involved the Department of Māori Affairs about the tampering with of a traditional Māori place name. Town signs around Hari Hari still state the name is Hari Hari. One newly placed town distance sign in Whataroa shows the name "Harihari".

The town was named in 1908 when a post office was needed for the township. "Hari Hari Post Office" was operated by Postmaster Hende. Prior to this, Hari Hari was called "Hende's Ferry" after the Hende family, the first European settlers in the area. Land Information New Zealand states, they have no record of "Hari Hari Post Office" and insist the "accepted" name is Harihari. They also state that a chain of surveyors who had surveyed the area over past years had used the shortened name. Locals say this is debatable and untrue. If true, this was either from a lack of knowledge of Hari Hari's given name, or the surveyors were simply saving time by shortening the town's name. This has resulted in confusion, and official Government Organizations and Internet sites World Wide, such as Google Earth not using the real town name.

Demographics
It is part of the wider Whataroa-Harihari statistical area.

The population of Hari Hari was 237 in the 2018 census, a decrease of 6 from 2013. There were 120 males and 117 females. 93.7% of people identified as European/Pākehā, 11.4% as Māori, 2.5% as Pacific peoples and 2.5% as Asian. 16.5% were under 15 years old, 13.9% were 15–29, 48.1% were 30–64, and 21.5% were 65 or older.

Whataroa-Harihari statistical area 

The statistical area of Whataroa-Harihari had a population of 642 at the 2018 New Zealand census, an increase of 30 people (4.9%) since the 2013 census, and a decrease of 111 people (-14.7%) since the 2006 census. There were 276 households. There were 348 males and 297 females, giving a sex ratio of 1.17 males per female. The median age was 40.7 years (compared with 37.4 years nationally), with 147 people (22.9%) aged under 15 years, 96 (15.0%) aged 15 to 29, 300 (46.7%) aged 30 to 64, and 102 (15.9%) aged 65 or older.

Ethnicities were 87.4% European/Pākehā, 13.1% Māori, 5.6% Pacific peoples, 2.8% Asian, and 3.3% other ethnicities (totals add to more than 100% since people could identify with multiple ethnicities).

The proportion of people born overseas was 11.7%, compared with 27.1% nationally.

Although some people objected to giving their religion, 51.9% had no religion, 35.5% were Christian, 0.5% were Buddhist and 2.3% had other religions.

Of those at least 15 years old, 57 (11.5%) people had a bachelor or higher degree, and 129 (26.1%) people had no formal qualifications. The median income was $31,400, compared with $31,800 nationally. The employment status of those at least 15 was that 276 (55.8%) people were employed full-time, 84 (17.0%) were part-time, and 12 (2.4%) were unemployed.

Education
South Westland Area School is a coeducational composite school (years 1-15), with a roll of  students as of  It opened in 1969, replacing Hari Hari School which had existed since 1865. The school has a satellite class at Franz Josef Glacier School.

There is also a University of Canterbury Field Station, "The Green Elephant".

References

External links
 South Westland Area School website

Westland District
Populated places in the West Coast, New Zealand